The Power is a 2016 science fiction novel by the British writer Naomi Alderman. Its central premise is women developing the ability to release electrical jolts from their fingers, thus leading them to become the dominant sex.

In June 2017, The Power won the Baileys Women's Prize for Fiction. The book was also named by The New York Times as one of the 10 Best Books of 2017.

Overview
The Power is a book within a book: a manuscript of an imagined history of the tumultuous era during which women across the world developed and shared the power to emit electricity from their hands. The manuscript is submitted by Neil Adam Armon to another author named Naomi, approximately five thousand years after the power emerges and revolution reassembles the world into a matriarchy. This historical fiction chronicles the experiences of Allie, Roxy, Margot, Jocelyn, and Tunde, as they navigate their rapidly changing world.

Plot 
In a matriarchal society, a gushing male writer writes to an influential author about his fictional account of how the matriarchy came to be. Five thousand years earlier (in our current time), men dominated society, until stories began to emerge of women who possessed an electrical power used first for self-defense, and eventually to attack, torture, even kill.

Roxy is an English teenager whose mother is attacked. She manages to defend herself, injuring one attacker, but another beats her up and kills her mother. Tunde is an aspiring journalist in Nigeria who starts to film women using their emerging power and publishing it online. Margot is a mayor in Wisconsin who discovers her daughter Jocelyn is also developing these powers. Allie is a girl who is raped by her foster father and kills him with her powers before taking refuge in a convent.

As the power emerges across the world, Tunde's reputation allows him unique access to Saudi Arabia and elsewhere to document growing turmoil. Allie discovers how to use her powers to heal and becomes an influential religious leader, propagating a matriarchal doctrine. Margot develops training camps for the women to use their powers. As women in Moldova start paramilitary groups, Tatiana, the president's wife, steps in to take over the country. Rival Awadi-Atif develops a rebel army to oppose her. Tunde is nearly raped by marauding women in India. Margot becomes governor by using her powers to silence her male opponent during a debate. A drug called "glitter" enhances the power of women's electricity-generating organs, called skeins. UrbanDox gains influence as an anti-woman activist. Roxy takes over her father's criminal enterprise. Tatiana begins to behave erratically, leading mass killings of men.

Allie kills Tatiana and decides to take the world back to the Stone Age to reset its growth and structures based on women's powers.

The influential author responds to the young male writer, telling him it is a worthy book, but that he should publish it under a woman's name if he wants to be taken seriously.

Main characters
Allie Montgomery-Taylor is a young girl who uses her power to kill her abusive foster father. She retreats to a convent where she becomes a religious figure named Mother Eve.
Roxy Monke is the young daughter of a London mob boss and is a witness to her mother's murder. She meets with Mother Eve at the convent to seek help in strengthening her powers and ends up becoming Mother Eve's confidante.
Margot Cleary is an American politician and advocate for training young girls on how to properly use their power. She creates the North Star Girls Camps across the country as part of her advocacy.

Other important characters
 Jocelyn Cleary is the daughter of Margot Cleary and experiences power fluctuations. Despite her difficulties, Jocelyn is able to awaken her mother's power.
Olatunde Edo (known as Tunde Edo) is a journalist who documents the growing power of women across the globe.  He first gains recognition by posting one of the first videos of women using their power online.
Tatiana Moskalev is the former first lady of Moldova. After killing her husband, she takes over the role of president and reconstitutes Moldova as a matriarchal country called Bessapara.
Neil Adam Armon is the fictional author of The Power and a member of The Men's Writers Association. Neil reaches out to Naomi through letters to discuss her thoughts on his book. (The name is an anagram of Naomi Alderman).

Development history
The Power is Alderman's fourth novel and was influenced by her relationship with Canadian novelist Margaret Atwood. The mentorship was arranged through the Rolex mentorship program. In an interview with The Daily Telegraph in 2012, Alderman explained the influence of Atwood's work on her as a novelist before the mentorship as, "I'd been to an Orthodox Jewish primary school where every morning the boys said, 'Thank you God for not making me a woman.' If you put that together with The Handmaid's Tale in your head, something will eventually go fizz! Boom!" In another interview regarding The Power, for The Guardian, Alderman described being inspired by Atwood, saying, "The one thing Margaret directly suggested was the idea of a convent." Within the novel, the setting of the convent plays a crucial role during the development of the power of women.

In December 2016, Alderman stated that "readers of The Power are already asking me if there'll be a sequel – there won't be another novel (probably), but there are definitely so many more stories to tell than I had room for in the book."

Literary significance and reception
The book, backed up by critics' reviews and awards, was broadly regarded as significant work of literature. The Washington Post reviewer Ron Charles praised the novel as "one of those essential feminist works that terrifies and illuminates, enrages and encourages."

The Power was the winner of the Baileys Women's Prize for Fiction in 2017.
The novel was also featured fourth in The 10 Best Books of 2017 list by The New York Times. The Guardian's deputy literary editor Justine Jordan praised the book by stating "it's also endlessly nuanced and thought-provoking, combining elegantly efficient prose with beautiful meditations on the metaphysics of power, possibility and change." In December 2017, former U.S. President Barack Obama named The Power as one of his favorite books of 2017.

There were some who criticized the novel. The New York Times Book Review contributor Amal El-Mohtar criticized the book for world-building and philosophical inconsistencies.

Adaptations

Television

The novel is set to be turned into a ten-episode Amazon Prime Video television series.

The TV rights to Naomi Alderman's work were acquired by Jane Featherstone in an 11-way auction. Upon this acquisition, Alderman said that "I can't wait to expand this story – and bring electric women to TV screens around the world." Along with being the series' writer, Alderman will also be a producer. The series intends to portray the characters' storylines from the book, while also exploring the characters' lives beyond the established narrative.

The series will be directed and executive produced by Reed Morano, director of the first three episodes of the acclaimed series The Handmaid's Tale. The all-female directing team is also set to include Ugla Hauksdóttir for two episodes and Shannon Murphy for two episodes. The series also has an all-female writer's room.

The cast includes Leslie Mann, Auliʻi Cravalho, John Leguizamo, Toheeb Jimoh, Ria Zmitrowicz, Halle Bush, Heather Agyepong, Nico Hiraga, Daniela Vega and Eddie Marsan.

The series was set to film in Vancouver from March–July 2020, but filming was postponed due to the COVID-19 pandemic.

In January 2021, Tim Robbins was cast in the role of Daniel Dandon. Rainn Wilson was originally cast in the role, but had to leave due to the production's delay.

In May 2022, production suffered a major setback due to Tim Robbins and Leslie Mann leaving their respective roles. In August 2022, it was announced that their roles would be assumed by Josh Charles and Toni Collette, respectively.

See also
 Biology in fiction, which considers this novel among others.

References

2016 British novels
English science fiction novels
2016 science fiction novels
Feminist science fiction novels
Gender role reversal
British novels adapted into television shows
Viking Press books
Women's Prize for Fiction-winning works